State Highway 60 (SH 60) is a State Highway in Kerala, India that starts in Angadipuram  and ends in Cherukara. The highway is 7.61 km long.

The Route Map 
Angadipuram – Pariyapuram – Cherukara

See also 
Roads in Kerala
List of State Highways in Kerala

References 

State Highways in Kerala
Roads in Malappuram district